Galina Petrovna Bukharina (born 14 February 1945) is a Soviet track athlete. She competed mainly in the 100 metres and 4 x 100 m relay. She is head coach of 400 m and relay athletes of India, at NIS, Patiala.

Personal life
Galina was born at Voronezh, Russia during Soviet era. In 1989 she moved to the US seeking better medical treatment for her daughter, who was suffering from cancer.

She became a US citizen. She initially worked as an elder care aide and house cleaner.

She has three grandchildren.

Career

Athlete
Bukharina trained at the Armed Forces sports society in Moscow. She competed for the Soviet Union in the 1968 Summer Olympics in the 4 x 100 metres. She won the bronze medal with her teammates Lyudmila Zharkova, Vera Popkova and Lyudmila Samotyosova. She participated at the 1972 Summer Olympics.

Coach
She started coaching in the Soviet Union, and  worked with the national setup for about 17 years. “I’ve competed in the Olympics myself but as a coach I have been more successful. I used to coach the women’s (Soviet Union) 4×400 team. They still hold the world record set under me. 3.15.17"s, she said. The record was set at the 1988 Games.

During her US stay, Galina wanted to return home after her daughter’s recovery. The USSR's collapse convinced her to prolong her stay. She coached for Texas State University-San Marcos, formally Southwest Texas State University, winning various NCAA meets until 2011, when she retired.

At 72, she was appointed 400m and relay coach of Indian national team. She coached Hima Das to become 2018 World Junior Champion and set national records. Mohammad Anas also won medals at various international platforms and set national records.

References

Sports Reference

External links
 

1945 births
Soviet female sprinters
Olympic bronze medalists for the Soviet Union
Athletes (track and field) at the 1968 Summer Olympics
Athletes (track and field) at the 1972 Summer Olympics
Olympic athletes of the Soviet Union
Living people
Armed Forces sports society athletes
European Athletics Championships medalists
Medalists at the 1968 Summer Olympics
Olympic bronze medalists in athletics (track and field)
Olympic female sprinters